Fancheng is a district of the city of Xiangyang, Hubei, People's Republic of China.

History

Fancheng, or Fan City, was an ancient city in Hubei, situated on the northern side of the Han River, opposite Xiangyang on the southern side of the river. Throughout history, the city has served both military and economic purposes and was famous for numerous battles including the Battle of Fancheng during the Three Kingdoms period and the Siege of Xiangyang during the Mongol invasions.

In 1949, Fancheng was merged with Xiangyang to form Xiangfan, a prefecture-level city. Fancheng is now a district of that city, encompassing  and having a population of 821,531, according to a 2010 census.

Administrative divisions
Subdistricts:
Hanjiang Subdistrict, Wangzhai Subdistrict, Zhongyuan Subdistrict, Dingzhongmen Subdistrict, Qinghekou Subdistrict, Pingxiangmen Subdistrict, Migong Subdistrict, Shipu Subdistrict, Zizhen Subdistrict, Qilihe Subdistrict, Dongfeng Subdistrict

Towns:
Niushou, Taipingdian, Tuanshan, Mizhuang

See also
 Fán (surname)

External links
Official website of Fancheng District Government

References

Ancient Chinese cities
Xiangyang